Nick Bernardone  is an American writer, producer and director from Syracuse, NY. His credits include Unbreakable Kimmy Schmidt, 30 Rock, Marvel's Wastelanders, The Walking Dead and Fear the Walking Dead.  Nick has been nominated for five Emmy Awards, and won a WGA Award and PGA Award.

Career
Early TV credits include Emmy Award winning 30 Rock and Netflix's Unbreakable Kimmy Schmidt.  Later work includes AMC's Fear the Walking Dead and "The Walking Dead".  Additional credits are "Marvel's Wastelanders", Saturday Night Live, HBO's Crashing, Bloodline, and Master of None.  Hot Garbage Video has produced several web videos such as series Bromos and Army Husbands. Classless was an official selection in the 2013 New York Television Festival. On February 2, 2022 it was announced Nick was attached to adapt the popular fantasy series The Riftwar Cycle for a potential television series. On December 5, 2022 it was announced Nick would co-write the final chapter in the crossover audio series Marvel's Wastelanders. Nick has been nominated for five Emmy Awards, and won a WGA Award and PGA Award.

Filmography

Awards and nominations

References

External links

Bromos
Channel101NY

Year of birth missing (living people)
Living people
21st-century American screenwriters
American male screenwriters
American television writers
Writers from New York City